Lelis is a genus of beetles in the family Carabidae, containing the following species:

 Lelis bicolor Chaudoir, 1896
 Lelis obtusangula (Chaudoir, 1852)
 Lelis quadrisignata (Buquet, 1834)
 Lelis rutila (Bates, 1869)
 Lelis viridipennis Chaudoir, 1869

References

Lebiinae
Carabidae genera